Anne Maree Stanley (born 6 October 1961) is an Australian politician. She is a member of the Australian Labor Party (ALP) and has served in the House of Representatives since the 2016 federal election, representing the Division of Werriwa. She previously served on the Liverpool City Council from 2008 to 2016.

Early life
Stanley was born in Sydney, one of two daughters born to Margaret and William Mee. Her parents were both ALP supporters, and her mother worked for the Building Workers' Industrial Union of Australia.

Prior to entering politics, Stanley worked as a bank officer for nearly 30 years.

Politics
Stanley joined the Australian Labor Party (ALP) in 1996 "as a response to the reactionary policies of the Howard government". She was an officeholder in the party's organisational wing before her election to parliament, serving as a delegate to state and national conferences and as president of the party's Liverpool South branch. She served on the Liverpool City Council from 2008 to 2016.

Parliament
In March 2016 Stanley won ALP preselection for the Division of Werriwa. She retained the seat for Labor at the 2016 federal election, succeeding the retiring member Laurie Ferguson. She was re-elected at the 2019 election, and was subsequently appointed as an opposition whip.

Personal life
Stanley has five children with her husband Larry. Her twin sons were born 11 weeks premature and spent time in the neonatal intensive care unit at Westmead Hospital.

References

1961 births
Living people
Australian Labor Party members of the Parliament of Australia
Members of the Australian House of Representatives for Werriwa
Members of the Australian House of Representatives
Women members of the Australian House of Representatives
Labor Left politicians
New South Wales local councillors
Place of birth missing (living people)
21st-century Australian politicians
21st-century Australian women politicians
Women local councillors in Australia